Anthracoidea is a genus of smut fungi belonging to the family Anthracoideaceae.

The genus has almost cosmopolitan distribution.

Species:

Anthracoidea altera 
Anthracoidea altiphila 
Anthracoidea americana

References

Ustilaginomycotina
Basidiomycota genera